Convoy Place  is a residential neighbourhood in Halifax on the Halifax Peninsula within the Halifax Regional Municipality of Nova Scotia.

References
 Destination Nova Scotia

Communities in Halifax, Nova Scotia